Claire Rutter (born 1972 in  South Shields) is an English operatic soprano.

Biography
Claire Rutter studied at the Guildhall School of Music and Drama and at the National Opera Studio. Her title role performances have included those in Norma and Tosca at Grange Park Opera, and in Lucrezia Borgia, La Traviata and Aida at English National Opera. She has also sung the role of Sieglinde in Die Walküre at Grange Park Opera. Her performances in the United States include those with Dallas Opera in 2003 (as Fiordiligi in Così fan tutte) and Santa Fe Opera in 2008 (as Alice in Falstaff). Rutter has recorded extensively for Naxos and Chandos.

Selected discography
Lennox Berkeley: A Dinner Engagement - City of London Sinfonia, Richard Hickox (conductor). Chandos CHAN 10219
Lennox Berkeley: Ruth - City of London Sinfonia, Richard Hickox (conductor). Chandos CHAN 10301
Gustav Holst: The Planets / The Mystic Trumpeter Op.18 - Royal Scottish National Orchestra and Chorus, David Lloyd-Jones (conductor). Naxos 8.555776
Herbert Howells: Hymnus paradisi / Sir Patrick Spens - Bournemouth Symphony Orchestra, The Bach Choir, David Hill (conductor). Naxos 8.570352
Carl Orff: Carmina Burana - Bournemouth Symphony Orchestra and Chorus, Marin Alsop (conductor). Naxos 8.570033
Arthur Sullivan: The Prodigal Son / Boer War Te Deum - New London Orchestra, Ronald Corp (conductor). Hyperion CDA67423
Arthur Sullivan: The Contrabandista / The Foresters - New London Orchestra, Ronald Corp (conductor). Hyperion CDA 67486

References

Changing tracks: Claire Rutter (interview), Scotland on Sunday, November 16, 2008. Accessed 10 January 2009. 
"Claire Rutter: McDonald's, KFC? Or a nice glass of wine?" (interview), The Independent on Sunday, June 30, 2002. Accessed 10 January 2009.
Chism, Olin, "'Così' entices Dallas Opera's players", Dallas Morning News, November 23, 2003. 
Thompson, Warwick, "Pharaonic Drag Queens Sparkle in Zandra Rhodes 'Aida' Costumes" (review of Aida at the English National Opera), Bloomberg News, November 9, 2007. Accessed 10 January 2009.

External links
Claire Rutter at Rayfield Allied
Claire Rutter at James Black Management (archived on 2018-01-05)

1972 births
Living people
Alumni of the Guildhall School of Music and Drama
English operatic sopranos
People from South Shields
Musicians from Tyne and Wear
21st-century British women opera singers